Sebastian Szikal (born 17 November 1986 in Nuremberg) is a German footballer who plays for TSV Aindling.

Career 
Szikal made his Bundesliga debut with 1. FC Nürnberg as an 87th minute substitute in a 2–1 home win against 1. FC Köln on 1 October 2005. He later moved to SV Darmstadt 98 and SpVgg Weiden.

References

External links 
 

1986 births
Living people
Footballers from Nuremberg
German footballers
Association football midfielders
Bundesliga players
1. FC Nürnberg players
SV Darmstadt 98 players